Kefalonian Lines is an inactive Greece-based ferry company got established in 2013 to completely cover the transportation needs of Cephalonia and the neighbouring island, Zakynthos.

Ships out of service

Notes 
 Zakynthos I is on charter from ANEZ.

Former Fleet 

 Nissos Kefalonia [2013-2018] now Kefalonia for Levante Ferries
 Alexandra L. [2018-2019] now Alexandra L. for Seajets

References

External links
http://kefalonianlines.com/

Ferry companies of Greece
Companies based in Athens
Greek companies established in 2013
Transport companies established in 2013